Premier Rugby Sevens (PR7s) is the top annual American men's and women's rugby sevens competition. The competition follows a touring competition model. It involves 16 teams (8 men's and 8 women's teams) competing against each other across the country. The league was founded in 2021 and is officially sanctioned by USA Rugby.

The League initially began with 10 teams (6 men's and 4 women's teams) in 2021. In 2022, the League moved to 8 teams (4 men's and 4 women's teams), before doubling its size to 16 teams (8 men's and 8 women's teams) in 2023.

The League is the first professional rugby union competition in North America to offer contracts to women.

History 

Premier Rugby Sevens was launched in 2021 by CEO and Founder Owen Scannell. The league's Inaugural Championship took place at AutoZone Park in Memphis, Tennessee on October 9th, 2021. The women's Loonies and men's Experts won the Inaugural Championships. The championship matches of the tournaments were aired live on FS2 in the United States, and TSN in Canada.

The competition scaled to a three stop circuit in 2022, with tournaments held in San Jose, California at PayPal Park, Washington D.C. at Audi Field, and the 2022 Championship at Q2 Stadium. The Headliners were the first United Champions and won the Kathy Flores Women's Championship while the Loggerheads won the A. Jon Prusmack Men's Championship. All matches from the 2022 Championship were aired live on Fubo Sports Network.

The League announced in December 2022 that it would expand into a conference structure and play a five-tournament circuit. Additionally, the 2023 expansion added regional names to the teams for the first time in league history.

PR7s Teams

Map

Current teams

Timeline

League champions

Men's Final

Women's Final

United Championship

See also 

 United States women's national rugby sevens team
 United States national rugby sevens team (men's)
 Major League Rugby
 Women's Premier League

References

External links 

 

Rugby union leagues in the United States
Women's rugby union competitions in the United States
Women's rugby union leagues
Sports leagues established in 2021
2021 establishments in the United States
Professional sports leagues in the United States